Peter "Pekka" Lindmark (born 8 November 1956) is a Swedish former ice hockey goaltender. During his career he represented three teams in Elitserien: Timrå IK, Färjestads BK and Malmö Redhawks.

He also had a successful international career, representing the Swedish National Team in several international tournaments, including the World Championships (where he won a gold medal in 1987), and the Canada Cup in 1981, 1984 and 1987. He was also awarded the IIHF (International Ice Hockey Federation) award for best goaltender in the world twice (1981 and 1986).

Awards
 Caps: 174
 Two time World champion: 1987 and 1991
 1984 Canada Cup runner up
 1992 European club champion with Malmö IF
 Four time Swedish champion (1986 & 1988 with Färjestads BK and 1992 & 1994 with Malmö IF)

References

External links

1956 births
Living people
People from Kiruna Municipality
Färjestad BK players
Ice hockey players at the 1988 Winter Olympics
Malmö Redhawks players
Olympic bronze medalists for Sweden
Olympic ice hockey players of Sweden
Swedish ice hockey goaltenders
Timrå IK players
Olympic medalists in ice hockey
Medalists at the 1988 Winter Olympics
Sportspeople from Norrbotten County